Leonard C. Staisey (November 10, 1920 – October 4, 1990) was a Democratic politician from Pennsylvania. Staisey was born in Pittsburgh and lived for most of his life in Duquesne, a nearby mill town. He was a member of the State Senate from 1961 to 1966, when he resigned to run for Lieutenant Governor. Considered a rising star in the party, he ran on a ticket with Milton Shapp, who would lose to Ray Shafer. From 1968 to 1976, he served as an Allegheny County Commissioner and was considered one of the area's last machine politicians. In 1979, he was elected to the position of judge in the Allegheny County Court of Common Pleas, and he served in this position until he resigned due to illness in 1989. The name of Staisey, who was blind from birth, adorns a Carnegie Library of Pittsburgh branch specializing in providing reading materials for the blind and physically disabled.

See also
List of first minority male lawyers and judges in Pennsylvania

References

Obituary 
Carlow Journal, featuring a short write up on Staisey
Carnegie Library branch

1990 deaths
1920 births
American politicians with disabilities
American blind people
Blind politicians
Politicians from Pittsburgh
Pennsylvania Democrats
20th-century American politicians
Allegheny County Councilmembers (Pennsylvania)